Vazgen Tevanyan (born 27 October 1999) is an Armenian freestyle wrestler who competes at 65 kilograms. An accomplished athlete, Tevanyan has most notably claimed the 2020 Individual World Cup and the 2019 U23 European Championships. He qualified for the 2020 Summer Olympics by winning the gold medal from the 2021 European Olympic Qualification Tournament.

He won the silver medal in the 70 kg event at the 2021 U23 World Wrestling Championships held in Belgrade, Serbia. He competed in the 65kg event at the 2022 World Wrestling Championships held in Belgrade, Serbia.

He is a 2023 Ibrahim Moustafa Tournament winner in the 65 kg held in Alexandria, Egypt.

References

External links 
 

Living people
Place of birth missing (living people)
Armenian male sport wrestlers
1999 births
Wrestlers at the 2020 Summer Olympics
Olympic wrestlers of Armenia
21st-century Armenian people